The Philippine Peace Cup was a four-nation international football competition organized by the Philippine Football Federation (PFF) which involves the national teams of the Philippines and three invitees. The inaugural edition took place in 2012, replacing the annual Long Teng Cup which the Philippines has been participants since its inception. The tournament also takes place around September to celebrate peace month in the Philippines.

Tournament name
The inaugural edition in 2012 was due to be the third annual Long Teng Cup, however, the organizers, the Chinese Taipei Football Association (CTFA), begged off from staging it and requested the PFF to host it. The PFF then renamed it as the Paulino Alcántara Cup, after Filipino–Spanish football legend who played for Barcelona. It was again renamed to the Paulino Alcántara Peace Cup and eventually to the Philippine Peace Cup as the Philippine Sports Commission, which operates the Rizal Memorial Stadium where the tournament was held, has a rule against events named after an individual.

As the tournament celebrates peace month, it also sees the involvement of the office of the presidential adviser on the country's peace process which played a role in the naming of the tournament.

Broadcasting
ABS-CBN is the official TV partner of the Peace Cup, airing the matches involving the Philippines on Studio 23 and other matches via International broadcasters, from 2012 to 2013. Starting 2014, ABS-CBN Sports and Action will air the games, after Studio 23 ceased broadcast.

Summary

General statistics
As of 2014 Philippine Peace Cup

References

 
International association football competitions hosted by the Philippines
Recurring sporting events established in 2012
Recurring sporting events disestablished in 2014
2012 establishments in the Philippines
2014 disestablishments in the Philippines